Haven Inc. is a company that automates logistics for ocean freight companies. Based in Singapore, San Francisco and Basel, it manages a freight rate and logistics for large international supply chains. Haven is considered one of the pioneers of the digital revolution in shipping logistics.

FourKites®, the market leader in real-time supply chain visibility, announced in April 2021 its acquisition of Haven, Inc., and introduction of Dynamic Ocean, a next-generation visibility solution that redefines end-to-end management for international ocean shipments.

History
Matt Tillman, a serial tech entrepreneur, had the idea for a freight and logistics platform in 2014, when he tried to book space on a container vessel to ship a truck. He created a reverse auction over email, treating all freight forwarders the same, and realized that the process could be automated. Tillman met with Jeff Wehner, who had worked in supply chain at Apple and Nest. They concluded that the traditional carrier-forwarder-shipper procurement structure was not the best model for shippers in terms of price discovery and booking. Together with Renee DiResta, they founded Haven Inc.

References

External links

Logistics companies of the United States
Software companies established in 2014
Companies based in San Francisco
Companies of Singapore
Companies based in Basel
Transportation companies based in California